Hasham or Hashem may refer to:

 Hasham Balm
 Hasham Kuh
 Hasham-e Champeh
 Hasham-e Howdow

See also
 Hashem
 Hashim (name)